On 9 May 1934, a Wibault 282T-12 of Air France crashed into the English Channel off Dungeness, United Kingdom, while operating an international scheduled passenger flight from Le Bourget, Paris, France to Croydon, Surrey, United Kingdom. All six people on board were killed.

Aircraft
The accident aircraft was Wibault 282T-12 F-AMHP, c/n 8. The aircraft had entered service with Air Union on 21 August 1933, passing to Air France on formation.

Accident
The aircraft was operating a scheduled international passenger flight from Le Bourget, Paris, France to Croydon, Surrey, United Kingdom. It was carrying three crew and three passengers. The aircraft had taken off from Le Bourget at 11:15 local time (10:15 GMT) and passed over Le Tréport, Seine-Maritime at 12:10. There were no further messages received from the aircraft. The weather at the time included low clouds.

The Dover lifeboat also joined the search. No trace of the aircraft was found during the search, which was hampered by thick fog. The Folkestone lifeboat did not return to its station until after 22:00 GMT. The lack of an SOS call from the aircraft indicated that it had crashed into the sea while attempting to fly below the low cloudbase. On 18 May, a mailbag from the aircraft was washed up on the French coast.

Casualties
The nationalities of the casualties were:-

References

Sources

Aviation accidents and incidents in 1934
Aviation accidents and incidents in Kent
Air France accidents and incidents
History of the English Channel
Airliner accidents and incidents involving controlled flight into terrain
1934 disasters in the United Kingdom
May 1934 events
1934 disasters in France